St. George's School is a private, Episcopal, coeducational boarding school in Middletown, Rhode Island, United States, just east of the city of Newport, on a hill overlooking the Atlantic Ocean.

It is a member of the Independent School League and is one of five schools collectively termed St. Grottlesex.

History

The school was founded in 1896 by reverend John Diman, a member of a prominent Rhode Island family.

The school became co-educational during the tenure of Anthony Zane, who served as headmaster beginning in the fall of 1972 until 1984.

Campus
The school's campus is known as "The Hilltop", as it is located on a hill just east of Newport. Its oldest buildings are on the National Register of Historic Places. The layout of the campus was designed by Frederick Law Olmsted.

Memorial Schoolhouse – The main academic building, in which most classes are held, in subjects other than art, music, and science.  Designed by McKim, Meade & White
Old School – The oldest building on campus
Academic Center 
Chapel – A Gothic chapel built in 1928, with John Nicholas Brown's donation and designed by Ralph Adams Cram. 
Hill Library – Contains more than 40,000 volumes and 75 periodicals.
John Nicholas Brown '18 Center – Named in honor of school alumnus John Nicholas Brown, class of 1918, the Brown Center was dedicated in the spring of 2005. It houses the College counseling offices on the main level; deans' offices on the second floor (director of studies, dean of students, dean of faculty).
Sixth-Form House – Originally used as the school gymnasium in 1903, it was converted to classroom use in 1911. Dormitory rooms for school prefects were also once located in the building. 
King Hall – The school's dining hall.
William H. Drury and Richard Grosvenor Center for the Arts – St. George's arts building.
Charles A. and Carol J. Hamblet Campus Center – Named in honor of the 10th headmaster and his wife, the Campus Center was dedicated in the fall of 2004. I
Dorrance Field House – Built in 1987, the Field House includes four indoor tennis courts, three basketball courts, and a ninth-of-a-mile indoor track.
Hoopes Squash Center – The Joseph C. Hoopes Sr. Squash Center, housing eight international glass-backed courts, was completed in 1996. Using the German made ASB court system, it serves during the summer months as the home for Mark Talbott's Squash Academy, the official training center of the U.S. Squash Racquets Association. It served as the site for both the National Junior Squash Championships in 1996 and 1998, and the Men's Squash Softball Championships in February 1997.
Stephen P. Cabot and Archer Harman Ice Center – The $4.5 million Stephen P. Cabot and Archer Harman Jr. Ice Center, completed in November 2000, has two ice hockey facilities. Originally built in 1954 as an outdoor rink and enclosed in 1968, the Cabot Memorial rink has new boards, a new surface (200′ × 85′) and a new roof.
Norris D. Hoyt Pool – The Norris D. Hoyt Swimming Pool is an eight-lane pool which hosts the St. George's Dragons Varsity Swim Team. The pool was completed in the fall of 2004, holding a large balcony seating area as well as deck-level glass viewing windows.
Ted Hersey Track – The track is all-weather, completed in the fall of 1996. It is a six-lane, 400-meter oval, with an eight-lane sprint chute along the east side. All St. George's field events are held on the inside, with the exception of the javelin throw. The area inside the oval is Redway Field and is large enough for an international-sized soccer field (360 feet by 225 feet).
Blazer and Wood Tennis courts – Blazer Tennis Courts are hardcourt-surfaced courts located at the main entrance of the school. The Wood Tennis Courts are six hardcourt-surfaced courts located across the street from the main entrance of the school.
Playing Fields – The 10 athletic fields include Crocker Field (used for varsity football and girls' varsity lacrosse), Elliott Field (used for varsity baseball), a JV baseball field, two field hockey fields, four lacrosse/soccer fields, and a softball field.
There are five boys' dorms and six girls' dorms.

Extracurricular activities
The school is a member of the Independent School League (ISL) and the New England Preparatory School Athletic Council (NEPSAC).

Geronimo is a Ted Hood-designed 69-foot fiberglass sloop. Three times during the academic year, Geronimo carries students from St. George's School on six-week-long voyages.  The ship sails year-round between Canadian waters and the Caribbean and is now making a two-year-long journey to the Mediterranean. Students are taught nautical science and oceanography/marine biology while on board. Summer trainees range in age from high school to adult.

In popular culture
 St. George's is mentioned in F. Scott Fitzgerald's classic first novel, This Side of Paradise, where the school is described as "prosperous and well-dressed".
 The school is featured in The Official Preppy Handbook by Lisa Birnbach.
 The Education of Charlie Banks (2007), co-starring Jesse Eisenberg and Eva Amurri and directed by Fred Durst, was filmed on the campus of St. George's. The establishing shots of the Old School building, King Hall, and the chapel were used to represent Vassar College. The motion picture also filmed at Brown University in Providence, R.I.

Notable alumni

 Vincent Astor, philanthropist, majority owner of Newsweek, member of the prominent Astor family
 John Jacob Astor V, philanthropist, owner of The Times
 John Jacob Astor VI, investor, of the Astor family
 Leonard Bacon, class of 1905, well recognized poet, writer, book critic, and winner of the Pulitzer Prize for poetry in 1940
 Livingston L. Biddle Jr., 1936, a descendant of the Philadelphia family, who wrote the legislation that led to the creation of the National Council on the Arts and the National Endowment for the Arts.
 Julie Bowen, 1987, actress best known for playing Claire Dunphy on Modern Family
 John Nicholas Brown, 1918, philanthropist, donor of the school's Chapel, member of the Brown family of Rhode Island, and former Assistant Secretary of the Navy
 Billy Bush, 1990, Access Hollywood anchor and host of the NBC prime-time show Let's Make a Deal
 Prescott Bush, 1913, World War I artillery captain, U.S. Senator from Connecticut 1953–1963, father of President George H. W. Bush, and grandfather of President George W. Bush 
 Tucker Carlson, 1987, writer and former host of Crossfire on CNN, followed by Tucker on MSNBC, and now the host of Tucker Carlson Tonight on Fox News
 Peter Cook (American anchor), 1985, Washington anchor for Bloomberg Television
 Philippe Cousteau Jr., 1998, founder of EarthEcho International, grandson of Jacques-Yves Cousteau
 Charles Dean, 1968, brother of Howard Dean, captured and executed in Laos
 Howard Dean MD, 1966, longest-serving Vermont governor 1991–2003, presidential candidate in 2004, and Chairman of the Democratic National Committee 2005–2009
 Kimberly Drew, American art curator and writer
 David Gilbert, 1986, author
 Robert E. Gross, 1915, American aviation businessman, founder and president of the Lockheed Corporation from 1934 to 1956. Featured in the 2004 blockbuster hit The Aviator
 William C. Hayes, 1961, leading authority on Egyptian history, and former curator of Egyptian art at the Metropolitan Museum of Art
 Chrissy Houlahan, 1985, U.S. Representative from Pennsylvania
 Frederic Rhinelander King, 1904, architect of the Episcopal Church of the Epiphany, York Avenue and 74th Street in New York City, and the Women's National Republican Club
 Laurence G. Leavitt, headmaster of Vermont Academy, Saxtons River, Vermont, for 25 years
 Anthony Mason, 1974, longstanding senior correspondent for CBS News and co-anchor of CBS This Morning 
 Ogden Nash, 1920, American poet and writer
 Diane Nelson, 1985, president of DC Entertainment from 2009 to 2018, and president and chief content officer of Warner Bros. Interactive Entertainment from 2013 to 2018
 Ivan Sergeyevich Obolensky, publisher and member of the Astor family
 Richard Painter, 1980, Professor of Corporate Law at the University of Minnesota Twin Cities, chief White House ethics lawyer in the George W. Bush administration
 Claiborne Pell, 1936, longest-serving Rhode Island Senator (in office 1961–1997); creator of the Pell Grant
 Roger W. Straus Jr., co-founder of Farrar, Straus and Giroux, a New York book publishing company
 Ian W. Toll, 1985, American author and historian
 Whitney Tower, longtime horse-racing journalist, and former chairman of the National Museum of Racing and Hall of Fame
 Russell E. Train, 1937, founder and past-president of the World Wildlife Fund
 William Henry Vanderbilt III, Governor of Rhode Island, philanthropist
 Harry Werksman, writer-producer for the third season of Grey's Anatomy
 Wilfrid Zogbaum, US avant-garde sculptor

Sexual abuse reports
In early 2016 the school stated that sexual abuse of students had occurred, dating from the 1970s, and perpetrated by employees and students. St. George's "repeatedly failed to notify police and child welfare authorities as required by law", a news report said. Many accusers at the time contested school assertions that accusations were only recent and "much of their anger has fallen on [the head of school]", the report continued. The extensive abuse—"at least 51 students were abused by employees ... and at least 10 others by fellow students"—was further documented in a 400-page independent report released in September.

The independent report also noted the following positive observation. "Fortunately, St. George's is certainly a very different place now. We find that St. George's current leaders have established a culture of respect for the students who attend there now, including new traditions that set an entirely different tone for students and faculty than prevailed during the 1970s  and  1980s.  We also find that St. George's  has in place programming, policies, practices, and systems intended to eliminate, to the largest extent possible, faculty abuse of students and student-on-student abuse, and to address correctly reports of abuse or assault should they arise. And the school is committed to a process of continuous improvement to ensure that its practices remain  those thought best to address difficult issues of faculty and student boundaries, student sexuality, and new opportunities for harm that digital and other new technologies may bring."

See also
 National Register of Historic Places listings in Newport County, Rhode Island

References

Further reading

External links

 School website

Schools in Newport County, Rhode Island
Independent School League
Private high schools in Rhode Island
Educational institutions established in 1896
Episcopal schools in the United States
Boarding schools in Rhode Island
Ralph Adams Cram church buildings
Properties of religious function on the National Register of Historic Places in Rhode Island
National Register of Historic Places in Newport County, Rhode Island
Buildings and structures in Middletown, Rhode Island
School sexual abuse scandals
1896 establishments in Rhode Island